Washington Grays may refer to:
 Washington Grays (song)
 Washington Grays Monument (Philadelphia)
 Washington Homestead Grays - a major Negro league baseball team that played from c.1912 to c.1950
 Washington Grays (North Carolina) - regiment
 Washington Grays (New York) - regiment
 Washington Grays (Philadelphia) - regiment